Philip John Routcliffe (October 24, 1870 – October 4, 1918) was a Major League Baseball outfielder. Nicknamed "Chicken", he played for the Pittsburgh Alleghenys of the National League during the 1890 season.

Sources

1870 births
1918 deaths
19th-century baseball players
Canadian expatriate baseball players in the United States
Davenport Hawkeyes players
Major League Baseball players from Canada
Major League Baseball outfielders
Pittsburgh Alleghenys players
Oswego Sweegs players
Sandusky Suds players
Sandusky Sands players
Sandusky Maroons players
Toledo Maumees (minor league) players
Quincy Ravens players
Tacoma Daisies players